Neomitranthes cordifolia is a species of plant in the family Myrtaceae. It is endemic to Brazil.

References

Flora of Brazil
cordifolia
Vulnerable plants
Taxonomy articles created by Polbot